"Stop n Think" is the a song by Australian singer, Hannah. The song was released in November 2002 as Hannah's second and final single. It peaked at number 18 on the ARIA charts.

Track listings
 CD single (Vibe Music Australia – VMA-H02)
 "Stop n Think"
 "Stop n Think" (KCB Klubbmix)
 "Stop n Think" (KCB Klubbmix Extended Version)
 "Stop n Think" (Karaoke Mix)
 "No Relief

Charts

References

2002 singles
2002 songs
Song articles with missing songwriters